Ansell is an Australian company which manufactures protective industrial and medical gloves. It was previously well known as a condom manufacturer but sold that division in 2017.

History

Early years 
Ansell was formed as Dunlop Pneumatic Tyre Company of Australasia Ltd in 1899, when the Dunlop Pneumatic Tyre Company of the United Kingdom incorporated its Australian branch, formed in 1893, and floated it on the Australian stock exchanges.  In 1906 the company changed its name to the Dunlop Rubber Company of Australasia Ltd, and in 1929 changed it again, following a merger with the Perdriau Rubber Company, to Dunlop Perdriau Ltd.

At this time the company's main business was the production of automobile tyres.  The company expanded into other rubber products, including footwear in 1948.  In 1967, the company changed its name to Dunlop Australia, and continued to dive
In 1969 Dunlop Australia acquired the Ansell Rubber Company, which had been founded in 1929 (originally as E. N. Ansell & Sons) by Eric Norman Ansell, at the time a worker for Dunlop Rubber Company of Australasia. Ansell started out developing condoms before moving into other areas such as gas masks and weather balloons as well as developing the first mass-produced disposable latex gloves.

Dunlop Australia continued to expand.  In 1980 it acquired a competitor and became known as Dunlop Olympic, and in 1986 changed its name to Pacific Dunlop, reflecting its geographic expansion. In 1986 it entered into a joint venture with Goodyear Tire to manufacture and distribute tyres in Australasia.  

In 1989 US medical devices company Becton Dickinson announced the planned divestiture of Edmont, the world's foremost industrial safety glove company as it did not fit with their portfolio of medical divisions. Pacific Dunlop saw the opportunity to acquire Edmont and use their international distribution set up to widen Ansell's market existence - a real synergy for both businesses.  The deal was done in mid 1990 setting the foundation that has expanded to what it has become today.  

Pacific Dunlop diversified into clothing, batteries, healthcare products and food, and by the mid-1990s was one of the 20 largest companies in Australia, with operations in 20 countries.

In the later 1990s, Pacific suffered from falling profits and a high debt burden.  It began a programme of divestment, selling its food and battery businesses.  The clothing and footwear businesses were floated off as Pacific Brands in 2001, and the company determined to focus on the healthcare products of its Ansell subsidiary.  Finally, in 2002, the company changed its name to Ansell Limited.

Recent years 

 2011, acquisition of Sandel Medical Industries, a recognized leader in the development of staff and patient safety disposable products in the US.
 2012, acquisition of Trelleborg Protective Products, a provider of chemical protective suits and Comasec, a player in the European personal protective equipment glove market.
 2013, acquisition of Midas, a Korean manufacturer and supplier of knitted, cut resistant industrial gloves and Hércules, a manufacturer of personal protective equipment in Brazil.
 2014, acquisition of BarrierSafe Solutions International, a North American provider of single-use gloves and Hands International, a Sri Lankan glove manufacturer.
 2017, sale of the sexual wellness business to chinese companies Humanwell Healthcare and CITIC Capital. The acquisition was completed on the same year. After the conclusion of the transaction, the sexual division was renamed to LifeStyles Condoms.
 2018, acquisition of Digitcae, a US exam and specialty glove supplier.

Brands and products 
Ansell has various sub brands operating around the world for its protective gloves products.

Mission 
To provide innovative safety solutions in a trustworthy and reliable manner, creating, an Ansell-protected world.

References

Manufacturing companies based in Melbourne
Australian brands
Companies listed on the Australian Securities Exchange
Manufacturing companies established in 1929
1929 establishments in Australia
Australian companies established in 1929